SCT, a three-letter acronym, may refer to:

Businesses and organizations
 Save China's Tigers, an international organisation that aims to save South China tigers
 SCT Logistics, a transport company in Australia
 Secretariat of Communications and Transportation (Mexico), Mexico's federal ministry of transportation and communications
 Slovenija ceste Tehnika, formerly the biggest Slovenian construction company
 Southampton Container Terminals, a port operator in Southampton, England
 Sree Chitra Thirunal College of Engineering, Kerala, India
 Suffolk County Transit, a bus system that serves Suffolk County, New York
 Systems & Computer Technology Corp., which was acquired by SunGard

Science
 Sacrococcygeal teratoma, a kind of tumor
 SCT (gene), gene for a human hormone secretin
 Scutum, a constellation
 Semi-Conductor Tracker, part of the Inner Detector in the ATLAS experiment
 Signed Certificate Timestamps, a part of Certificate Transparency
 Systems-centered therapy, a type of psychotherapy also frequently utilized in organizational development
 Social cognitive theory, a psychological theory about learning through observation
 Schmidt–Cassegrain telescope, a common type of telescope

Medicine
 Sluggish cognitive tempo, a potentially new attention disorder distinct from attention-deficit hyperactivity disorder (ADHD)
 Stem cell transplantation, see Hematopoietic stem cell transplantation

Other uses
 Scotland, per BS 6879 standard
 Sentence completion tests
 SEPA Credit Transfer, a standardised pan-European payment instrument used across the Single Euro Payments Area or SEPA
 Seychelles Time, a time zone used in the Seychelles
 Signed certificate timestamp, a timestamp returned by the certificate transparency log when a valid digital certificate is submitted
 Socotra Airport, on a Yemeni island of Socotra in the Indian Ocean
 Survival craft transceiver, a type of handheld radiotelephone used for maritime on-scene rescue communication
 YAKINDU Statechart Tools, software for the specification and development of reactive, event-driven systems
 Social Contract Theory, a moral theory most famously espoused by Thomas Hobbes citing social laws and customs, upheld by a monarach or other government, is the primary basis for morality

See also
 S. Ct.